"BonBon" is a song by Kosovo-Albanian singer and songwriter Era Istrefi. The song was written by Istrefi and Ergen Berisha, while produced by Big Bang, Cricket and Toton.  released it as a single for digital download and streaming in the United States on 30 December 2015. A dance-pop, dancehall, EDM and R&B song, its Albanian-language lyrics imply a message of empowerment and self-love. The song received widespread acclaim from music critics, several of whom praised the music and lyrics as well as Istrefi's appearance. Some praised Istrefi's vocal delivery, likening it to Rihanna or Sia. The song became Istrefi's breakthrough single, topping the charts in Albania and reaching the top 10 in four other countries. It was awarded gold certifications in various countries alongside a platinum certification in France by the Syndicat National de l'Édition Phonographique (SNEP).

For promotion, an accompanying music video was uploaded to 's YouTube channel on 30 December 2015, before it was transferred to the channel of Ultra Music on 7 March 2016. Filmed in the mountainous region of Brezovicë, Kosovo, the video depicts Istrefi walking across a snow-covered road. The singer performed the song at several occasions throughout 2016, including in Albania, Germany, France and Romania.

Background and composition 

Born into an Albanian musical family, Istrefi began pursuing a professional music career in 2013 and rose to widespread attention in the Albanian-speaking territories at a relatively early stage. She made her international breakthrough in early 2016, after the release of ", which secured her a recording contract with Ultra Music. With a length of two minutes and 47 seconds,  released it as a single for digital download and streaming in the United States on 30 December 2015. It was written by Istrefi and Ergen Berisha, with the production handled by Big Bang, Cricket and Toton. Johnny Horesco and Miles Walker mastered and mixed the song, respectively. Musically, "" is as a dance-pop, EDM, R&B and dancehall-leaning song. During the song's Albanian-language and occasional English lyrics, Istrefi implies an empowerment message, singing about self-love and how she does not need anyone to make her feel happy.

Reception 

Upon its release, "" was met with widespread acclaim from music critics. Many critics praised Istrefi's appearance and vocal delivery, constantly comparing it to that of Barbadian artist Rihanna and Australian musician Sia. David Rishty from Billboard also responded positively towards the song and linked her aesthetic to that of American disc jockey-trio Major Lazer. Ultra Music's executive Patrick complimented the song for its "oriental" appeal and found the lyrical alternation between Albanian and English as "seamless" and "special". Tanja Hill of The Source wrote that Istrefi portrays a "smooth" and "sexy" sound with an "irresistible" beat. The staff of BigFM expected a chart success in Germany and wrote that "", including its "smooth, sexy-smoky-sounding tones" fusing pop, reggae and dubstep, was destined for a chill evening. Fans of "" included Bebe Rexha, Imany, Jelena Karleuša, Jesse Saint John, Katy Perry, Kim Kardashian and P. Diddy. "" won the Song of the Year at the 2016 Top Music Awards in Tirana, Albania. Istrefi also was awarded the 2017 European Border Breakers Award for the single's achievements and success.

Commercial performance  

"" experienced widespread success on record charts, reaching top 10 positions were achieved in the Commonwealth of Independent States (CIS), Germany, Greece, Lebanon, Romania, Russia and Sweden. "" further reached the top 50 in Australia, Austria, Belgium, Denmark, France, Switzerland and Ukraine. Due to high sales, "" was awarded gold certifications in Australia, Canada, Denmark, Germany, Italy and the Netherlands. In February 2017, the single also received a platinum certification by the Syndicat National de l'Édition Phonographique (SNEP) in France for shifting more than 133,333 units.

Promotion and other usage 

An accompanying music video for "" was initially uploaded to 's official YouTube channel on 30 December 2015. After she was signed to the label, the video was transferred on 7 March 2016 to the channel of American record label Ultra Music on the aforementioned platform. The three-minute long video was filmed in the mountainous region of Brezovicë, Kosovo. It features scenes of Istrefi walking across a snow-covered road dressed in a green parka-jacket with bright pink fur.

Upon her international breakthrough, Istrefi performed "" in various countries. In 2016, the singer provided live performances at the Top Music Awards and Skopje Calling Festival in June, as well as at the NRJ Music Tour in Roubaix in July and the Coca-Cola Happy Energy Tour in Sofia in September. She later performed the song at the Untold Festival in Cluj-Napoca in August 2017. In May 2016, she further went on to perform "" on German game show Schlag den Star and French television programme Mad Mag. The single was further featured on an episode of American series Dynasty in 2016 and in the dance video game Just Dance 2017. Greek actress Konnie Metaxa and Romanian singer Adina Răducan impersonated Istrefi and provided performances of the recording for the Greek and Romanian versions of the reality talent show of Your Face Sounds Familiar, respectively.

Credits and personnel 

Credits adapted from Tidal.

Era Istreficomposing, songwriting, vocals
Big Bangproducing
Cricketsongwriting
Ergen Berishasongwriting
Johnny Horescomastering
Miles Walkermixing
Totonsongwriting

Track listing 

Digital download
"BonBon"2:47

Digital downloadEP
"BonBon"2:47
"BonBon" (English Version)2:47
"BonBon" (Post Malone Remix)3:22
"BonBon" (Marshmello Remix)3:03
"BonBon" (Luca Schreiner Remix)5:35

Charts

Weekly charts

Monthly charts

Year-end charts

Certifications

Release history

References 

2015 songs
2016 songs
2015 singles
2016 singles
Era Istrefi songs
Albanian-language songs
English-language Albanian songs
Music videos shot in Kosovo
Song recordings produced by Big Bang
Song recordings produced by Cricket
Songs written by Jenson Vaughan
Ultra Records singles